Homicide for the Holidays is an American television series which airs during the Thanksgiving/Christmas holiday season each year on the Oxygen Network. The program details crimes committed during the holidays.

Production
Homicide for the Holidays first aired on December 3, 2016 with the episode, "A Deadly Thanksgiving".  It was not renewed for the 2020 holiday season.  However, it will return on December 6, 2021, with the episode "The Last Thanksgiving," about the brutal murders of Joel and Lisa Guy. The new episodes will air for a limited run from December 6-Ongoing. Episode Listing

Episodes

Series overview

Season 1 (2016)

Season 2 (2017 - 2018)

Season 3 (2019)

Season 4 (2021-2022)

Season 5 (TBD)

References

External links

2016 American television series debuts
Oxygen (TV channel) original programming